Yevgeny Alexandrovich Lagunov (born 14 December 1985) is a freestyle swimmer from Russia, who won the bronze medal in the 100 m freestyle at the European Short Course Swimming Championships 2005 in Triest, Italy. He also competed in the 2004, 2008 and 2012 Summer Olympics.  At the 2008 Summer Olympics he was part of the Russian team that won silver in the 4 × 200 m freestyle relay, and at the 2012 Summer Olympics he won a bronze medal in the 4 × 100 m freestyle.

References

1985 births
Living people
Russian male freestyle swimmers
Olympic swimmers of Russia
Olympic silver medalists for Russia
Olympic bronze medalists for Russia
Swimmers at the 2004 Summer Olympics
Swimmers at the 2008 Summer Olympics
Swimmers at the 2012 Summer Olympics
Sportspeople from Arkhangelsk
World record holders in swimming
Olympic bronze medalists in swimming
World Aquatics Championships medalists in swimming
Medalists at the FINA World Swimming Championships (25 m)
European Aquatics Championships medalists in swimming
Medalists at the 2012 Summer Olympics
Medalists at the 2008 Summer Olympics
Olympic silver medalists in swimming
Universiade medalists in swimming
Universiade gold medalists for Russia